This is a list of cathedrals in New Zealand sorted by denomination.

Catholic
The following cathedrals of the Catholic Church in New Zealand (all of which are of the Latin Rite) are located in New Zealand:
 St Patrick's Cathedral in Auckland
 Cathedral of the Blessed Sacrament in Christchurch
 St Mary's Pro-Cathedral in Christchurch
 Cathedral of the Blessed Virgin Mary, Hamilton
 Cathedral of the Holy Spirit, Palmerston North
 St Joseph's Cathedral in Dunedin
 Metropolitan Cathedral of the Sacred Heart in Wellington

Eastern Orthodox
The following cathedrals of the Greek Orthodox Holy Metropolis of New Zealand:
Cathedral of the Annunciation of the Virgin Mary, Wellington

Anglican
The following cathedrals of the Anglican Church in Aotearoa, New Zealand and Polynesia are located in New Zealand:
 Cathedral of the Holy Trinity in Auckland
 Transitional Anglican Cathedral in Christchurch
 ChristChurch Cathedral in Christchurch
 St Paul's Cathedral in Dunedin
 Christ Church Cathedral in Nelson
 Waiapu Cathedral of Saint John the Evangelist, Napier in Napier
 St Peter's Cathedral in Hamilton
 The Taranaki Cathedral, the Church of St Mary in New Plymouth
 Wellington Cathedral of St Paul in Wellington

See also

List of cathedrals

References

 
New Zealand
Cathedrals in New Zealand
Cathedrals